Alfred Gundersen (11 May 1892 – 8 January 1958) was a Norwegian wrestler. He represented the club IF Ørnulf and competed in the middleweight event at the 1912 Summer Olympics.

References

External links
 

1892 births
1958 deaths
Olympic wrestlers of Norway
Wrestlers at the 1912 Summer Olympics
Norwegian male sport wrestlers
Sportspeople from Oslo